The Rukhuna reliquary, also sometimes Rukhana reliquary, also described as the Bajaur reliquary inscription, is a Scythian reliquary which was dedicated and inscribed in 16 CE by Rukhuna, Queen of Indo-Scythian king Vijayamitra (ruled 12 BCE - 20 CE). The inscription on the reliquary, also called the Bajaur reliquary inscription, was published by Richard Salomon with a photograph in 2005, and gives a relationship between several eras of the period, and especially a confirmation of a Yavana era (Yoṇaṇa vaṣaye) in relation to the Azes era, that is "Azes era= Yavana era - 128 years".

Inscription
The inscription is very useful to clarify relative chronologies during the period. The inscription reads:

In Kharoshthi, the referential dates at the beginning of the inscription appear both in words and in numbers, together with the name of the era they are calculated in, and are given as follows:

This dedication also indicates that King Vijayamitra and his wife Rukhuna were followers of Buddhism.

Since Vijamitra is said to have ruled 27 years already, his reign started in 12 BCE, and ended probably a few years after the dedication took place, around 20 CE.

The authenticity of the inscription is nearly unanimously accepted by the academic community, Gérard Fussman being a dissenting voice.

Similar examples of reliquaries

Notes

References
Baums, Stefan. 2012. “Catalog and Revised Texts and Translations of Gandharan Reliquary Inscriptions.” In: David Jongeward, Elizabeth Errington, Richard Salomon and Stefan Baums, Gandharan Buddhist Reliquaries, pp. 212–213, Seattle: Early Buddhist Manuscripts Project (Gandharan Studies, Volume 1).
Baums, Stefan, and Andrew Glass. 2002– . Catalog of Gāndhārī Texts, nos. CKI 405

 Richard SALOMON, "A New Inscription dated in the "Yona" (Greek) Era of 186/5 B.C." in Afghanistan, ancien carrefour entre l'est et l'ouest, O. Bopearachchi, M.-F. Boussac (eds.), 2005,  Languages: French, English 

1st-century inscriptions
Indo-Scythian peoples
Reliquaries
Archaeological discoveries in Pakistan